Serena Williams's 2004 tennis season did not begin until Miami, due to a left knee injury which kept her off court since Wimbledon in 2003.

Year in detail

NASDAQ-100 Open
Williams missed the first quarter of the season and played her first tournament at the NASDAQ-100 Open in Miami. Williams was seeded first despite the 8-month lay-off with the withdrawal of the top 5. Williams played her first match against Marta Marrero dropping only a game in just 42 minutes. In her next match, she took on Elena Likhovtseva, the pair traded sets to push it to a decider which Williams won in her fifth match point. In the Round of 16, Williams won in straight sets against young Russian Maria Sharapova. In the last 8, Williams dominated compatriot Jill Craybas, dropping only a single game. Williams then faced surprise semifinalist Eleni Daniilidou and won both set in four to advance to her first final in her first tournament since winning Wimbledon. In the final, Williams faced Russian Elena Dementieva. Dementieva took the first game before Williams could win the next 11 games before Dementieva could take another game. Williams then close it out in the next game to win her third Miami title in 50 minutes.

Clay Season and French Open

Bausch & Lomb Championships
Williams began her claycourt season at the Bausch & Lomb Championships where she was the second seed. Williams received a bye and then faced Mary Pierce in her first match and defeated the former Amelia Island champion in straight sets. In the third round, Williams took on Karolina Šprem and took the first set with a drop of only a game, but Šprem took the first 3 games of the second just to see Williams take 7 of the next 9 to win the match. In the last 8, Williams went against 7th seed Nadia Petrova, Williams fell in straight sets after tweaking her knee in the fifth game and making 42 unforced errors.

Family Circle Cup
Williams then played at the Family Circle Cup as the second seed. Williams received a bye in the first round to win in straight sets against Kelly McCain dropping only a game. Williams then withdrew from her match against Conchita Martínez with a sore left knee.

Internazionali BNL d'Italia
After missing a month due to knee injury, Williams came back at the Internazionali BNL d'Italia, Williams had a bye in the first round, she then played María Sánchez Lorenzo, Williams was a bit rusty losing the first two games in each set, but came through in straight sets. Williams then faced Dally Randriantefy, Williams only dropped four games, despite failing to serve the match at eight game of the second. In the final 8, Williams went against Svetlana Kuznetsova, after scrapping through the first set, Williams ended the match with a bagel to advance. In the semifinals, Williams fell to Jennifer Capriati in straight sets despite saving a match point, winning only four games in each set.

French Open
Williams came into the French Open as the second seed. She opened her campaign against Iveta Benešová and won in straight sets, including a 28-point game in the seventh game of the second set. Williams next opponent was young Russian Maria Kirilenko who was making her French Open debut. The pair traded the first two sets, with Kirilenko leading by a break in the third, Williams then broke back in the eighth game and also broke in the tenth game to take the match. Williams then took on Silvija Talaja, Williams won in straight dropping only 4 games and delivering a bagel in the first set, despite making 9 double faults in the match. In the fourth  round, Williams came through with ease against Japan's Shinobu Asagoe. Williams then took on compatriot Jennifer Capriati, the two Americans traded the first two sets, which was halted by rain. The third set, saw Capriati took and early break, and Williams broke back, just to be broken again in the eight game and took initiative and served it out.

Wimbledon
Williams came into Wimbledon as the two-time defending champion. Williams defeated Zheng Jie, dropping only four games and saved all ten break points she faced. In the following round, Williams took on Stéphanie Foretz Gacon and made quick work of the first set, taking it in a bagel. Williams then took the next set with a break lead. She then continued her good run again dropping four games, with a bagel in the second against Magüi Serna. In the round of 16, Williams faced fresh faced 16-year-old Tatiana Golovin and made quick work in straight sets. In a much anticipated quarterfinal match-up against Jennifer Capriati, Williams made quick work of her adversary in a double bagel in just 42 minutes. Williams had a semifinal clash against Amélie Mauresmo, Williams dropped her first set of the tournament in a tie-break. Williams then came back by breaking the Frenchwoman at the end of the second and third set, to come through to her third Wimbledon final in a row. In the final, Williams took on surprise finalist Maria Sharapova, where Serena lost surprisingly in straight sets, handing her younger Russian foe her first slam.

US Open Series

JPMorgan Chase Open
Williams began her US Open Series at the JPMorgan Chase Open. She received a bye in the first round as the top seed and then faced Greek Eleni Daniilidou. Williams took the first with ease, but scraped through the second in a tie-break. She then took out Arantxa Sánchez Vicario in the following round in straight sets, with a bagel in the first. In the final 8, Williams went against Russian Vera Zvonareva, after dropping the first set, Williams was able to go through 3 and 3. She then faced another Russian in Elena Dementieva and beat Dementieva in two close sets. However, in the final Williams was beaten comfortably by compatriot Lindsay Davenport, Williams winning only four games.

Acura Classic and Olympics
Williams then played at the Acura Classic. She received a bye in the first round and faced Jelena Janković losing the first set in a tie-break, but taking the next two sets to advance. In the round of 16, she took on Russian Elena Bovina and won in straight sets. However, Williams withdrew prior to her quarterfinal match against Vera Zvonareva because of swelling in her left knee. Williams was bound to play at the Olympics, when she withdrew due to the same injury.

US Open
 Williams aiming for her third US Open title after missing last year's edition. Williams' opened up against Czech Sandra Kleinová, Williams made quick work of Kleinová, winning in straight sets in just 53 minutes. In the following round Williams faced compatriot Lindsay Lee-Waters and dropped just seven games to advance. In the third round, Williams took on quick rising 16-year-old Tatiana Golovin. Golovin broke Williams early, however Williams came back and broke in the seventh game and took the set in the twelfth game. Williams then won the second set with a single break lead. In the round of 16, Williams defeated Patty Schnyder in two comfortable sets to advance to the quarterfinals. In the last 8, Williams took on adversary Jennifer Capriati, Williams dominated the 1st set with two breaks. Capriati then came back to win the second set. Capriati then took the final set to send Williams packing. However, the match was full of intrigue as several bad calls were made in the match against Williams. An overrule was made by chair umpire Mariana Alves in Capriati's favor, even though later video review showed this to be an error (as William's shot was well-inside the court).  This was one of several calls that incorrectly went against Williams throughout the match.  Williams attempted to argue the call, but was not successful. Capriati won the match, but tournament officials dismissed the umpire from the tournament. The controversy renewed calls for the adoption of technology like the MacCam and Hawk-Eye systems.

Asian and indoor season

China Open
Williams's next tournament was the inaugural China Open. She received a bye in the first round and faced Dinara Safina and was pushed by her 60th-ranked opponent to a third set, which Williams won in four. In the quarterfinals, she faced Nadia Petrova; however, Petrova retired while Williams was leading by a set and a break. In the final four, Williams took on another Russian, Vera Zvonareva, and won in straight sets. In the final, Williams faced her fourth Russian opponent in US Open champion Svetlana Kuznetsova, making Williams take on only Russians in the event. Kuznetsova took the first set, by breaking Williams in the tenth game. Williams then saved a match point in the second and broke her Russian foe in the eleventh game and served it out in the following game. In the third set, Williams raced through the first four game; however, Kuznetsova won four of the next five games. Williams served it out in the tenth game, to end Kuznetsova's 14-match winning streak and win her second title of the year.

Generali Ladies Linz
After withdrawing from Porsche Tennis Grand Prix and Zurich Open, Williams chose to compete at the Generali Ladies Linz despite being unwell and hampered still by a knee injury. Williams received a bye and faced Russian Alina Jidkova. Williams lost the first set in a tie-break and eventually lost the second set and the match at two.

WTA Tour Championships
Williams qualified for the Season Ending Championships and was placed in the Red Group with world no. 1 Lindsay Davenport, Anastasia Myskina, and Elena Dementieva. Williams played her first round robin match against 5th-ranked Dementieva. Williams scraped through in straight sets, winning the first set in a tie-break and the second set in the twelfth game. In her second round robin, Williams took on another Russian and French Open champion, Myskina. Myskina took a set and the first three games of the second set. However, Williams took six games in a row to push it to a third. Williams then took the third set in the tenth game. In her final round robin, Williams faced Davenport. Williams took the first set; however, Davenport pegged back, winning a tightly contested second set. Davenport then closed out the final set, letting Williams win only a game. Despite the loss, Williams came through to the semifinals, while Davenport was eliminated. In the semifinals, Williams took on Amélie Mauresmo, her French opponent won the first set. However, Williams came back and won the second set in a tie-break. Williams then closed out the final set at four to advance to the final. In the championship match, Williams took on Maria Sharapova in a rematch of the Wimbledon final. The pair traded the first two sets. Williams aggravated an already-existing abdominal injury at the end of the second set that limited her service motion. Williams took the first four games; however, Sharapova took the last six games, to earn her second win over the younger Williams.

All matches

Singles matches

Tournament schedule

Singles schedule
Williams' 2004 singles tournament schedule is as follows:

Yearly records

Head–to–head matchups
Ordered by percentage of wins

 Elena Dementieva 3–0
 Eleni Daniilidou 2–0
 Tatiana Golovin 2–0
 Svetlana Kuznetsova 2–0
 Amélie Mauresmo 2–0
 Vera Zvonareva 2–0
 Marta Marrero 1–0
 Elena Likhovtseva 1–0
 Jill Craybas 1–0
 Mary Pierce 1–0
 Kelly McCain 1–0
 María Sánchez Lorenzo 1–0
 Dally Randriantefy 1–0
 Zheng Jie 1–0
 Stéphanie Foretz Gacon 1–0
 Magüi Serna 1–0
 Arantxa Sánchez Vicario 1–0
 Elena Bovina 1–0
 Sandra Kleinová 1–0
 Karolina Šprem 1–0
 Jelena Janković 1–0
 Lindsay Lee-Waters 1–0
 Patty Schnyder 1–0
 Dinara Safina 1–0
 Anastasia Myskina 1–0
 Nadia Petrova 1–1
 Maria Sharapova 1–2
 Jennifer Capriati 1–3
 Alina Jidkova 0–1
 Lindsay Davenport 0–2

Finals

Singles: 5 (2–3)

Earnings

 Figures in United States dollars (USD) unless noted.

See also
2004 Maria Sharapova tennis season
2004 WTA Tour

References

External links

Serena Williams tennis seasons
Williams, Serena
2004 in American tennis